The 2018 Copa Colombia, officially the 2018 Copa Águila for sponsorship reasons, was the 16th edition of the Copa Colombia, the national cup competition for clubs of DIMAYOR. The tournament was contested by 36 teams. Junior were the defending champions, but were knocked out by Atlético Nacional in the quarterfinals. Atlético Nacional were the champions after beating Once Caldas 4–3 on aggregate in the final, and qualified for the 2019 Copa Libertadores.

Format
For the 2018 season, the Copa Colombia had a change in its format. Unlike previous editions, there was no group stage and the competition was played in a single-elimination format in its entirety, with the 16 teams from the Categoría Primera B entering the first stage and being drawn into eight ties. After two stages, four Primera B teams qualified for the third stage, along with the twelve Categoría Primera A teams that did not enter international competition in the 2018 season, which entered the cup at that stage. Finally, in the round of 16, the eight third stage winners were joined by the four Copa Libertadores qualifiers (Atlético Nacional, Junior, Millonarios and Santa Fe), as well as the four Copa Sudamericana qualifiers (Independiente Medellín, América de Cali, Deportivo Cali, and Jaguares), which entered the competition at this point.

First stage
The first stage was played by the 16 Categoría Primera B clubs, eight of which were seeded in the ties according to their position in the 2017 season aggregate table. The two relegated clubs from the Categoría Primera A (Cortuluá and Tigres) along with the remaining Primera B clubs were drawn into each tie. The seeded clubs hosted the second leg. The first legs were played on 21–22 February and 10 March 2018, while the second legs were played on 13 and 14 March 2018.

|}

First leg

Second leg

Second stage
The second stage was played by the 8 first stage winners. In each tie, the clubs with the best performance after the first stage hosted the second leg. The first legs were played on 28–29 March and 12 April 2018, and the second legs were played on 11–12 and 26 April 2018.

|}

First leg

Second leg

Third stage
The third stage was played by the four second stage winners and the 12 Categoría Primera A clubs that did not qualify for international competition, which were seeded in the ties according to their position in the 2017 season aggregate table. The two promoted clubs from the Categoría Primera B (Leones and Boyacá Chicó) were the last two seeded teams, with Leones taking the 11th position and Boyacá Chicó the 12th position. The four second stage winners as well as the best four teams according to the 2017 Primera A aggregate table hosted the second leg. The first legs were played on 2–3 and 9 May 2018, while the second legs were played on 9–10 and 16 May 2018.

}

|}

First leg

Second leg

Final stages
Each tie in the final stages will be played in a home-and-away two-legged format. In each tie, the team with the better overall record up to that stage will host the second leg, except in the round of 16 where the third stage winners will host the second leg. The teams entering this stage will be the ones that qualified for the 2018 Copa Libertadores and 2018 Copa Sudamericana, and were drawn into each of the eight ties. In case of a tie in aggregate score, neither the away goals rule nor extra time are applied, and the tie is decided by a penalty shoot-out.

Bracket

Round of 16
The third stage winners (Team 2) hosted the second leg. The first legs were played from 15 to 22 August, and the second legs were played from 21 to 30 August 2018.

|}

First leg

Second leg

Quarterfinals
Team 2 hosted the second leg. The first legs were played on 12 and 13 September 2018, and the second legs were played on 19 and 26 September 2018.

|}

First leg

Second leg

Semifinals
Team 2 will host the second leg. The first legs were played on 3 and 5 October, and the second legs were played on 11 and 12 October 2018.

|}

First leg

Second leg

Finals

Atlético Nacional won 4–3 on aggregate.

Top goalscorers

See also
 2018 Categoría Primera A season
 2018 Categoría Primera B season

References

External links 
  

Copa Colombia seasons
1